Dichomeris cisti is a moth of the family Gelechiidae. It is found in Spain.

The wingspan is about 16 mm. The forewings are mouse-grey, with black scales. The hindwings are lighter grey.

References

Moths described in 1859
cisti